Jason Lee Vandelannoite (born 6 November 1986) is a Belgian professional footballer who plays as a defender for Torhout 1992 KM. He previously played for Club Brugge, Bursaspor, A.F.C. Tubize, Sheffield United, Qormi, Hibernians, Valletta, Universitatea Craiova, KRC Gent-Zeehaven, KFC Sparta Petegem, and St. Andrews.

Career
Vandelannoite featured in the Champions League group stage with Club Brugge, in a 1–1 draw with Bundesliga side Bayern Munich, where he played the whole 90 minutes. He also represented Belgium in the UEFA European Under-17 Championship (First qualifying round)

Before playing for Hibernians F.C., Vandelannoite played for Qormi F.C. in Malta. Upon his release by Hibernians he joined Valletta F.C.

References

External links

Living people
1986 births
People from Roeselare
Association football defenders
Belgian footballers
Club Brugge KV players
Bursaspor footballers
A.F.C. Tubize players
Qormi F.C. players
Hibernians F.C. players
Valletta F.C. players
CS Universitatea Craiova players
Belgian Pro League players
Süper Lig players
Maltese Premier League players
Belgian expatriate footballers
Expatriate footballers in Turkey
Expatriate footballers in Malta
Belgian people of Democratic Republic of the Congo descent
Footballers from West Flanders
K.R.C. Gent players